A hailstorm is a thunderstorm that produces hail.

Hailstorm may also refer to:

 Hailstorm (Ross the Boss album), 2010
 Microsoft HailStorm, the codename for a Microsoft service
 Hailstorm, a 1994 album by Barathrum
 Hailstorm, a cell-site simulator made by Harris Corporation

See also
Halestorm, an American rock band
 Halestorm (album), their debut album

es:Granizada